Jayden de Laura (born August 11, 2001) is an American football quarterback who currently plays at the University of Arizona.

High school career 
De Laura began his high school football career at Damien Memorial School in Honolulu, Hawaii, playing on the school's junior varsity team as a quarterback, safety, kicker and punter before dislocating his collarbone two games into the season. He then decided to focus exclusively on playing quarterback, transferring to Saint Louis School in Honolulu, which has produced quarterbacks such as Timmy Chang, Marcus Mariota, Tua Tagovailoa, and Chevan Cordeiro. De Laura also worked to increase his weight from 140 pounds with help from his family, including his uncle Mel, a former strength & conditioning coach at Hawaii and SMU under June Jones.

After sitting out his sophomore year due to transfer rules, de Laura took over the starting job from Cordeiro in his junior season, where he helped lead them to a state title while throwing for over 2,000 passing yards. In his senior season, he followed that by throwing for 3,452 yards and 29 touchdowns and was named the ILH offensive player of the year and Hawaii's Gatorade Player of the Year award.

A three-star recruit by 247Sports and ESPN, de Laura committed to playing college football at Washington State on October 2, 2019.

College career

Washington State 
Initially unsure about his future at Washington State following the departure of Mike Leach and other offers from schools such as Ohio State, de Laura reaffirmed his commitment to Washington State following the hire of Hawaii head coach Nick Rolovich, whose run and shoot offense is similar to the one de Laura ran at Saint Louis.

De Laura was named the starting quarterback for the opening game against Oregon State in 2020, becoming the first true freshman to start a game at quarterback in program history. He missed one game against Stanford after testing positive for COVID-19.

Suspension 
De Laura was arrested on February 26, 2021, in Pullman on suspicion of driving under the influence and was suspended indefinitely from the football team following the arrest. He was later found not guilty on July 29, 2021.

Arizona 
After the end of the 2021 Washington State season on January 7 , De Laura entered his name into the transfer portal. On January 10 , De Laura announced his intention to transfer to the University of Arizona.

Statistics

References

External links 
 
 Washington State bio

2001 births
Living people
Sportspeople from Honolulu
Players of American football from Honolulu
American football quarterbacks
Saint Louis School alumni
Washington State Cougars football players
Arizona Wildcats football players